The Cock-Eyed World is a 1929 American pre-Code musical comedy feature film. One of the earliest "talkies", it was a sequel to What Price Glory? (1926), it was directed and written by Raoul Walsh and based on the Flagg and Quirt story by Maxwell Anderson, Tom Barry, Wilson Mizner, and Laurence Stallings. Fox Film Corporation released the film at the Roxy in New York on August 3, 1929.

The film stars Victor McLaglen and Edmund Lowe, reprising their original roles, as well as Lili Damita. The picture was also released in a silent version on October 5, 1929.

Plot

Flagg (Victor McLaglen) and Quirt (Edmund Lowe) find themselves transferred from Russia to Brooklyn to South America, in each place squaring off over a local beauty.

The film remains one of the earliest screen sequels to a critical and popular success with the two lead actors playing the same characters, as well as the original writers and director intact from the first picture.

Cast
Victor McLaglen as Top Sergeant Flagg 
Edmund Lowe as Sergeant Harry Quirt 
Lili Damita as Mariana Elenita 
Leila Karnelly as Olga 
El Brendel as 'Yump' Olson 
Joe Brown as Brownie 
Stuart Erwin as Buckley

Opening week record
According to Variety, the film beat every known gross for any box office attraction throughout the world with a reported first week gross of $173,391 at the Roxy. It grossed another record $173,667 in its second week.

References

External links

1929 films
1929 musical comedy films
American musical comedy films
American black-and-white films
Films directed by Raoul Walsh
Military humor in film
Films about the United States Marine Corps
Fox Film films
1920s English-language films
1920s American films